In Medias Res is the second and last studio album by progressive rock band PMtoday. The album was released on April 6, 2010. The album's name is a Latin phrase, which literally translates in English to "in the middle of things". It is a reference to the literary technique in which a story begins in mid-action. This album marks the first appearances of guitarist Cuinn Brogan and bassist Jerrod Morgan, replacing former members Kevin Middleton and Nick Hargett respectively.

Track listing

Personnel 
PMtoday
Connor Brogan – lead vocals, rhythm and lead guitar, keys
Cuinn Brogan – lead and rhythm guitars, vocals, keys
Jerrod Morgan – bass guitar, vocals
Ryan Brogan – drums, percussion, vocals

Production
Produced, mastered and mixed by Kris Crummett
Art direction and design by Glenn Thomas

References 

2010 albums
PMtoday albums
Rise Records albums
Albums produced by Kris Crummett